Amboasary is a rural municipality located in the Marolambo District, Atsinanana region of eastern Madagascar. It borders West of the Marolambo National Park

References

Populated places in Atsinanana